Eocithara waihaoensis is an extinct species of sea snail, a marine gastropod mollusk, in the family Harpidae.

References

waihaoensis
Gastropods described in 1935